Billy Hart (born November 29, 1940) is an American jazz drummer and educator. He is known internationally for his work with Herbie Hancock's "Mwandishi" band in the early 1970s, as well with Shirley Horn, Stan Getz, and Quest, among others.

Biography
Hart was born in Washington, D.C. He grew up in close proximity of the Spotlite Club, where he first heard the music of Lee Morgan, Ahmad Jamal, and Miles Davis, among others.

Early on in his career he performed with Otis Redding and Sam and Dave, then with Buck Hill. Although he studied mechanical engineering at Howard University, he left school early to tour with Shirley Horn, whom Hart credits with accelerating his musical development. He was a sideman with the Montgomery Brothers (1961), Jimmy Smith (1964–1966), and Wes Montgomery (1966–68).  Following Montgomery's death in 1968, Hart moved to New York City, where he recorded with McCoy Tyner, Wayne Shorter, Joe Zawinul, and Pharoah Sanders (playing on his famed recording Karma in 1969), in addition to playing with Eddie Harris, Joanne Brackeen, and Marian McPartland.

Hart was a member of Herbie Hancock's "Mwandishi" sextet from 1969 to 1973, recording three albums with Hancock (Mwandishi, Crossings, and Sextant) in this period. He subsequently went on to perform with Tyner (1973–74), Stan Getz (1974–77), and Quest (1980s), in addition to extensive freelance playing (including recording with Miles Davis on 1972's On the Corner). He recorded his debut album Enchance in 1977, supported by musicians such as Don Pullen, Dave Holland, and Dewey Redman. Holland returned to play on Hart’s third release Oshumare in 1984, which also featured Branford Marsalis and Bill Frisell, among others.

Since the early 1990s, Hart has been associated with Oberlin Conservatory of Music. He also teaches at the New England Conservatory of Music, as well as holding an adjunct faculty position at Western Michigan University. He also conducts private lessons through the New School and New York University. The drummer often contributes to the Stokes Forest Music Camp and the Dworp Summer Jazz Clinic in Belgium.

Hart first formed his current Quartet (composed of Mark Turner, Ethan Iverson, and Ben Street) in 2003; they have gone on to record three albums as a group, most recently for ECM Records. He also performs with guitarist Assaf Kehati, and is a member of the band known as the Cookers, typically consisting of Eddie Henderson, David Weiss, Craig Handy (now Billy Harper), George Cables, and Cecil McBee. The band has toured extensively and has recorded six albums together.

In 2021, Hart was announced as a 2022 National Endowment for the Arts (NEA) Jazz Master, along Stanley Clarke, Cassandra Wilson, and Donald Harrison, Jr.

Hart resides in Montclair, New Jersey, where he has a music studio described by JazzTimes as his "inner sanctum".

Discography

As leader 
 Enchance (Horizon, 1977)
 The Trio with Walter Bishop Jr. & George Mraz (Progressive, 1982)
 Oshumare (Gramavision, 1984)
 Rah (Gramavision, 1988)
 Amethyst(Arabesque, 1993)
 Oceans of Time (Arabesque, 1997)
 Billy Hart Quartet (HighNote, 2006)
 Route F (Enja, 2006)
 Live at the Cafe Damberd (Enja, 2009)
 Sixty-Eight (SteepleChase, 2011)
 All Our Reasons (ECM, 2012)
 One Is the Other (ECM, 2014)

As sideman 
Dates indicate the year of the album's release. If the recording was issued more than a year later, the recording date is followed by the release date in brackets. "With" marks collaborative recordings as band and with the musicians equal credit for the album. Otherwise the Leader/line-up column is sorted by the musician's first name. Musicians and labels are only linked on first appearance.

References

External links 

 Official site
 Interview by Ethan Iverson
 [ Billy Hart] at Allmusic
 Discography at Discogs
 Billy Hart Interview NAMM Oral History Library (2020)

1940 births
Living people
Musicians from Washington, D.C.
20th-century American drummers
20th-century American male musicians
American jazz drummers
American male drummers
American male jazz musicians
New England Conservatory faculty
Catalyst (band) members
Mingus Dynasty (band) members
Quest (band) members
The Jazztet members
The Leaders members
Arabesque Records artists
ECM Records artists
Enja Records artists
Gramavision Records artists
HighNote Records artists
SteepleChase Records artists
NoBusiness Records artists
People from Montclair, New Jersey